Johannes Scherbius (1 June 1769, Frankfurt am Main – 8 November 1813) was a German physician and botanist.

In 1790 he obtained his doctorate of medicine at Jena, later working as a physician in his hometown of Frankfurt. In Frankfurt, he was associated with the Senckenberg Institute.

With Philipp Gottfried Gaertner and Bernhard Meyer, he was co-author of "Oekonomisch-technische Flora der Wetterau" (Economic-technical flora of Wetterau), a three-volume work that was a source of scientific names for numerous plants.

Published works 
 "Dissertatio inauguralis medica de Lysimachiae purpureae sive Lythri salicariae Linn. virtute medicinali non dubia", Jenae, Ex Officina Fiedleriana (1790).
 "Commentationis de sanguinis missione in febribus intermittentibus", (1790).
 Oekonomisch-technische Flora der Wetterau, (1799-1802, 3 vols. [vol. 1 (VI-VII.1799); vol. 2 (V-VII.1800); vol. 3 (1) (I-VI.1801); vol. 3 (2) (1802); (with Philipp Gottfried Gaertner and Bernhard Meyer).
 Pharmakopoe und Arznei-Taxe für das bei der hiesigen Armen-Anstalt angestellte medicinische Personale, (1809).

References 

1769 births
1813 deaths
Physicians from Frankfurt
University of Jena alumni
19th-century German botanists
Scientists from Frankfurt
18th-century German botanists